Rohault de Fleury is a French family name. It may refer to:

Charles Rohault de Fleury (1801–1875), French architect 
Georges Rohault de Fleury (1835–1904), French archaeologist and art historian
Hubert Rohault de Fleury (architect) (1777–1846), French architect
Hubert Rohault de Fleury (general) (1779–1866), French soldier
Hubert Rohault de Fleury (painter) (1828–1910), French painter

Surnames of French origin